Hokédhe Kué 196E, also known as Myers Lake, is an Indian reserve of the Smith's Landing First Nation in Alberta, located within the Regional Municipality of Wood Buffalo.

References

Indian reserves in Alberta